The 1985 Cork Intermediate Hurling Championship was the 76th staging of the Cork Intermediate Hurling Championship since its establishment by the Cork County Board in 1909. The draw for the opening round fixtures took place on 27 January 1985. The championship began on 12 May 1985 and ended on 18 August 1985.

On 18 August 1985, Éire Óg won the championship following a 0-14 to 2-07 defeat of Blackrock in the final at Riverstown Sportsfield. This was their second championship title overall and their first title since 1979.

Pat Walsh was the championship's top scorer with 5-10.

Results

First round

Second round

Quarter-finals

Semi-finals

Final

Championship statistics

Top scorers

Overall

In a single game

References

Cork Intermediate Hurling Championship
Cork Intermediate Hurling Championship